Moitessieria locardi is a species of freshwater snail in the family Moitessieriidae. It is endemic to France, where it lives in underground water bodies. It is a protected species that could be threatened by water pollution and overexploitation of aquifers.

References

Moitessieriidae
Endemic molluscs of Metropolitan France
Gastropods described in 1863
Taxonomy articles created by Polbot